Global Gaming Expo (G2E) is a gambling industry trade show presented by the American Gaming Association (AGA) and organized by Reed Exhibitions. The flagship G2E convention debuted in 2001 and is held each fall in Las Vegas, Nevada.

G2E Las Vegas

The first Global Gaming Expo took place October 13, 2001 at the Las Vegas Convention Center (LVCC), featuring 375 corporate exhibitors, nearly 10,000 attendees, and VIP keynote speakers such as Academy Award-winning actress Whoopi Goldberg and then-chairman and CEO of MGM Studios Alex Yemenidjian. After failing to negotiate a contract renewal with GEM in 2000, however, the AGA elected to launch G2E as a rival exhibition that would be "by the industry and for the industry." Its first year was also WGCE's last; sixth months after the inaugural Global Gaming Expo, AGA bought out WGCE, establishing G2E as North America's largest exhibition for the gaming-entertainment industry.

In 2010, the AGA announced that the tenth annual expo that November would be the last to take place at  before a move to the privately-owned Sands Expo, where G2E has  remained. The change of venue was accompanied by a return to the exhibition's original time of year, with the AGA citing the need for "more breathing room between major international gaming events" among its reasons for moving back to early October.

G2E features educational sessions that typically run from Monday through Thursday of the conference week, as well as an expo hall open from Tuesday through Thursday where hundreds of exhibitor companies showcase products and services. , annual total show attendance has consistently topped 25,000, and in 2017 G2E was recognized as one of the 25 fastest-growing trade shows by attendance.

G2E Asia
Specifically targeting the growing Asian gaming industry, the annual Global Gaming Expo Asia (G2E Asia) is, like its larger American counterpart, presented by the American Gaming Association and organized by Reed Exhibitions. In 2006, the same year Macau's gambling industry surpassed that of Las Vegas in gross gaming revenues, Global Gaming Expo acquired the Asian Gaming Expo from the Australasian Gaming Machine Manufacturers Association, and announced that it would rebrand the annual event as G2E Asia.  The convention debuted at the Macau Tower June 1314, 2007, shortly before the opening of G2E Asia's long-term home, The Venetian Macao, which  has housed the expo in every year since.

In 2019, G2E Asia expanded its scope with the announcement of the inaugural G2E Asia @ the Philippines exhibition, to take place December 34 of that year in cooperation with the Philippine Amusement and Gaming Corporation. Organizers selected the Marriott Manila, part of the Resorts World Manila integrated resort, as the venue for the new event.

References

 "Technology changes rise to the forefront at this year's G2E" (reviewjournal.com)
 "G2E 2014 wrapped up another exciting edition yesterday in Las Vegas" (Yogonet.com) 
"Global Gaming Expo to tackle industry’s most pressing issues in 2015 seminar line-up" (Yogonet.com) 
Look to the future: Games on display at G2E show transition to skill-based products (vegasinc.com)
“I expect we’ll see a proliferation of skill-based games at G2E Las Vegas" (Yogonet.com) 
G2E announces new team members (ggrasia.com)
"G2E Asia 2015 had record number of visitors" (ggrasia.com)

External links
Official site
Global Gaming Expo Asia official site
 American Gaming Association
Reed Exhibitions Official site
Global Gaming Women

Las Vegas Valley conventions and trade shows
Recurring events established in 2001
Trade shows in the United States
Gambling in the United States